The 9th European Parliament was elected across the European Union in the late days of May 2019 for the 2019–2024 session. In the United Kingdom the election took place on 23 May. The elected MEPs sat until the formal Brexit date – 31 January 2020.

Final members

Changes in members or affiliation 

Alyn Smith won a seat in the House of Commons for SNP in December 2019. He therefore ceased to be an MEP for Scotland then. Heather Anderson was nominated to replace him as MEP. Anderson only served as MEP from 28 January until the Brexit date on 31 January, a total of 4 days.
Annunziata Rees-Mogg, Lance Forman, Lucy Harris and John Longworth left the Brexit Party and joined the Conservatives. Louis Stedman-Bryce and Andrew England Kerr changed their affiliation from the Brexit Party to be independent.

References 



2019
List
United Kingdom